Evil Cat (凶貓) is a 1987 Hong Kong film directed by Dennis Yu.

Plot
The Cheung Family has been fending with the Evil Cat for eight generations. This time, the Evil Cat reincarnates and possesses a tycoon's body. Severe fights start in order to eliminate the Evil Cat. One day, at Tina's home, the Cat dwells in, Cheung shoots Tina at the shoulder but Inspector Wu comes to her rescue just before Cheung can kill the Cat. Pulling out the charmed arrow in Tina's shoulder, the Cat recovers its power.

References

External links
 
 Evil Cat at the Hong Kong Movie DataBase

1980s supernatural horror films
1987 films
1987 horror films
Hong Kong supernatural horror films
1980s Hong Kong films